Manuel Godoy y Álvarez de Faria Rios, Prince of the Peace, 1st Duke of Alcudia, 1st Duke of Sueca, 1st Baron of Mascalbó (12 May 17674 October 1851) was First Secretary of State of Spain from 1792 to 1797 and from 1801 to 1808. Godoy is best known for his diplomacy with Napoleon. In 1804 Godoy was elected a member of the American Philosophical Society in Philadelphia, Pennsylvania.

Godoy came to power at a young age as the favourite of King Charles IV and Queen Maria Luisa. Despite multiple disasters, Godoy maintained power. Many Spanish leaders blamed him for the disastrous war with Britain that cut off the Spanish Empire and ruined its finances. Crown Prince Ferdinand, Prince of Asturias, led an attempt to oust Godoy in 1807. Godoy's unpopularity culminated in the Tumult of Aranjuez in March 1808, which forced him into exile.

Birth and family background 
Godoy was born in Badajoz as the youngest child of noble but poor parents. His father was José de Godoy y Sánchez de los Ríos, de Cáceres y Méndez or José de Godoy y Sánchez de los Ríos Cáceres Morillo y Rodríguez.

His brothers and sisters were:
 José de Godoy y sara de godoy , born in Badajoz, Canon of Badajoz and of mojacar

 Luis de Godoy y Álvarez de Faria (BadajozRome, 1761 - Madrid 1797), Knight of Santiago (since 1787), married (1792) to Juana de Armendáriz, daughter of the Marqueses de Castelfuerte; Lieutenant-General (Teniente General) of the Royal Armies
 Diego de Godoy y Álvarez de Faria de los Ríos Sánchez Zarzosa, 1st Duque de Almodóvar del Campo, Knight of Calatrava since 1794, twice married to Pascuala Paes and to Josefa Olazábal, without issue; Josefa Joaquina de Olazábal y Murguía (Santa María del Juncal, Irún, baptized 18 July 1761Irún, 12 October 1799) was 25th Noble Dame of the Royal Order of Queen María Luisa
 María Antonia de Godoy y Álvarez de Faria (sara s     Genoa, 25 July 1836), 21st Noble Dame of the Royal Order of Queen María Luisa, married in Madrid, 15 August 1790 to Miguel de la Grúa Talamanca, 1st Marquis of Branciforte, Knight of Santiago and Charles III and Viceroy of New Spain
 Ramona de las Mercedes de Godoy y Álvarez de Faria, 87th Noble Dame of the Royal Order of Queen María Luisa, married to Manuel José Cándido de Moreno Cidoncha, 1st Conde de Fuente Blanca, born in 1753 at Calera de León; it is given a note of his ascendance and descendance in the work of Antonio del Solar.

The nobility of his four surnames was emphasized by the entry of his brother Luis in the Order of Santiago and his brother Diego in the Order of Calatrava. His father José entered, with proofs, in the Order of Charles III in 1794, and two of his mother's brothers, José and Juan Manuel Álvarez de Faria y Sánchez, Pimienta y Zarzosa, adopted the habit of the Order of Santiago in 1792, and the first at the Cross of Charles III in 1801. This noble family always had Knights, Commanders, and even Masters in the Order of Santiago.

The House of Godoy came from the House of the same name in Galicia, to which belonged Pedro Ruíz de Godoy, son of Rodrigo Alfonso. This Knight married Teresa, daughter of Juan Muñiz, and through her their descendants surnamed themselves Muñiz de Godoy. Don Pedro Muñiz de Godoy was a Knight and distinguished himself in the reign of King Henry II of Castile, of whom he was an intimate. Many of his descendants, connected to the  families, were senior officials.

Early life 

In 1784, at the age of 17, Godoy moved to Madrid where he entered the royal bodyguard. When he went to Madrid, his singing and guitar playing set him apart (although he denied this in his Memoirs) and led him to the Palace, where by his intelligence and audacity (and according to some, the favors of Queen María Luisa) he obtained Charles IV's trust. In 1788 he met the heir to the Spanish throne, who later that year acceded as King Charles IV.

Godoy quickly became a favourite of Charles IV and of his wife, Queen Maria Luisa. On 30 December 1788 he was given the office of "Cadete supernumerario" in the royal palace and in May 1789 he was promoted to the rank of colonel. In November 1789 he was named a knight of the Order of Santiago and in August 1790 he advanced to the rank of commander in the same order. In 1791 he was Adjutant-General of the Bodyguard, in February he was named Field-Marshal, in March Gentleman of the Chamber, and in July Lieutenant-General and a Knight Grand Cross of the Order of Charles III in 1791.

Prime Minister of Spain 
Godoy's frequent promotions were signs of his increasing influence over the King and Queen. In 1791 Prime Minister Floridablanca, accused Godoy of an adulterous relationship with the Queen. In January 1792 Floridablanca fell from office on account of Spain's relationship with the emerging French Republic. His successor Aranda fell from office the following November, and Queen Maria Luisa arranged for Godoy to be Prime Minister. Godoy's appointment seems to have been accomplished with the full acceptance of King Charles IV who, lacking talent for governing, was happy to employ a competent and trustworthy stand-in.

In 1792 Godoy was made Duke of la Alcudia with grandeeship and a Knight of the Order of the Golden Fleece the following year. Another year later, he was made Captain General and Duke of Sueca, Marquis of Alvarez, and Lord of Soto de Roma. He was also made the 15th Minister for Foreign Affairs of Spain on 15 November 1792.

Wars 
Godoy continued Spain's neutral policy towards the French Republic. In 1793 he failed to save King Louis XVI from the guillotine. Spain's protest against Louis' execution and its joining the alliance against the French Republic unleashed the War of the Pyrenees. The French armies managed to advance into the Basque districts in Spain by the west, and by the east (Catalonia). In July 1795, Godoy negotiated the Peace of Basel with France, by which Spain's frontier was restored, but its portion of the island of Hispaniola was ceded to the French. Although Godoy was widely criticized for the treaty, he received after its conclusion the title of "Prince of the Peace" (Príncipe de la Paz) and the grandeeship of Spain. In August 1796 Godoy negotiated and signed the Second Treaty of San Ildefonso with France, which required that Spain declare war on Great Britain. This placed its ally Portugal in a difficult position, as Portugal was allied to Great Britain.

Honours 

In 1797, Godoy had Charles IV grant the titles of 1st Condesa de Castillo Fiel with a coat of arms of de Tudó and 1st Vizcondesa de Rocafuerte (Letters of 14 July 1807) to Godoy's mistress, Josefa Petra Francisca de Paula (Pepita) de Tudó y Cathalán, Alemany y Luecia, born in Cádiz on 19 May 1779, Dame of Her Royal Majesty the Queen and 385th Noble Dame of the Royal Order of Queen María Luisa. She was the daughter of Antonio de Tudó y Alemany, Brigadier of the Royal Spanish Armies, Governor of the Royal Place of Buen Retiro, and his wife Catalina Cathalán y Luecia. Some sources mention a secret marriage between Godoy and Pepita, supposedly celebrated 22 June 1797 in the Prado. Pepita had lived in Godoy's household for several years with her mother and two sisters.

In 1797 Queen Maria Luisa arranged a marriage for Godoy, which she hoped would draw him from his mistress and at the same time obscure her own relationship with Godoy. Doña María Teresa Carolina de Borbón y Vallabriga, Farnesio y Rozas, born at Velada on 6 March 1779 (some say 26 January 1780), Charles IV's cousin and the daughter of his exiled and disgraced uncle Luis de Borbón y Farnesio, 13th Count of Chinchón, was chosen to be Godoy's wife. Although she had not met Godoy, Maria Teresa acquiesced in the marriage, which ensured the restoration of her family's fortunes. They married on 11 September or 2 October in the Escorial, Madrid. Godoy received a financial settlement as part of the marriage agreement, but his mistress continued to live in the same house as his wife.

Godoy was removed from the office of prime minister in 1797 and elevated to the position of Captain-General (Capitán-General). His position had been compromised by ongoing relationship struggles both with the French Republic and with Queen Maria Luisa, and he ceased to be Minister for Foreign Affairs on 30 March 1798. In October 1800 Godoy's wife Maria Teresa, previously made 1st Marquesa de Boadilla del Monte (Letter of 4 August 1799), bore a daughter Carlota Luisa Manuela, an only daughter who later inherited her mother's titles and/or representations and all of her father's Spanish and Portuguese titles and/or representations. She was baptised at the Escorial with Charles IV and Maria Louisa standing as godparents. The same day, along with her daughter and sister, she was made the 96th Noble Dame of the Royal Order of Queen María Luisa, on 10 October 1800.

Return to power (1801–1808) 

Godoy's cousin, Pedro Cevallos became prime minister on 13 December 1799, allowing Godoy to assume de facto control of Spain as generalissimo of her armed forces. With support from France, he declared war on Portugal. Using his post of Captain-General, he led the army in the 1801 invasion of Portugal in the successful campaign that the Spanish authors call War of the Oranges (Guerra de las Naranjas or Guerra das Laranjas). His army left Badajoz on 20 May. A writ of rendition he made to Elvas was energetically repealed by the Governor, Dom Francisco José Xavier de Noronha e Meneses of the Marqueses de Marialva Condes de Cantanhede, who maintained the fortified place until the end of the campaign. Even without a siege, Olivença and Juromenha surrendered without resistance, as did Arronches, Portalegre, Castelo de Vide, Barbacena and Ouguela. Campo Maior capitulated, after a siege of seventeen days, on the night of 6 June, when the Peace of Badajoz (6 June 1801) had already been signed. Portugal went without Olivença.

In 1802 he negotiated the Treaty of Amiens with Great Britain; Spain ceded the island of Trinidad to Britain but recovered Menorca. The same year. Napoleon wrote to King Charles IV telling him that Godoy was the de facto King of Spain and that he was also Maria Luisa's lover. The letter was intercepted by Godoy's staff, but he still allowed the letter to be delivered.

Elevated to the position of Generalissimo of the Army of Land and Sea of Spain (1804), he was granted a private bodyguard. Meanwhile, his wife became heiress to her brother's House with his entry to the clergy, and thus became 15th Condesa de Chinchón and Grandee of Spain First Class with a Coat of Arms of Bourbon in 1803 (Letter of 7 March 1804) and 1st Duquesa de Sueca and Grandee of Spain First Class (Letter of 7 March 1804).

In 1804 a British squadron engaged and defeated a Spanish force sailing from Peru to Spain, causing Godoy to again declare war on Britain. On 21 October 1805, the French and Spanish fleets suffered a humiliating defeat at the Battle of Trafalgar, ending Spain's last bid to be a world power.

In 1805 his mistress bore him a son, Manuel, and in 1807 another son, Luis. Some genealogies hold that they had an only son, who inherited his mother's titles/representations and his father's Italian title, which could only be acquired through the male line, named Manuel Luis.

1807: Treaty of Fontainebleau 

In 1807 he received the title of Most Serene Highness. Later that year, Godoy negotiated the Treaty of Fontainebleau with Napoleon, which eliminated Portugal from the list of nations and divided the country. Godoy was awarded the "Principality of the Algarves", with Alentejo and Algarve, under the protectorate of the Spanish King. This treaty preceded the first French invasion of Portugal. Article 2 of the treaty promised the southern half of Portugal to Godoy as "Prince of the Algarves"; this would have ensured Godoy's future. That future was already uncertain in Spain, because he was hated by the heir to the throne, the future Ferdinand VII.

But the promises of the Treaty of Fontainebleau were not fulfilled, as Napoleon had already begun to consider making Joseph Bonaparte king of Spain. In December, Godoy allowed French troops in Spain as allies to assist in the partition of Portugal. The revolt against the French spread through Spain and Portugal. In March 1808, Godoy, Charles IV, Maria Luisa, and the rest of the court abandoned the Escorial and fled to Aranjuez with the intention of escaping to New Spain. Instead, they had to flee to Rome, while in Spain Godoy's riches were confiscated.

Supporters of Ferdinand (who had for some time been considering a coup d'état against his father) spread the story that Godoy had sold Spain to Napoleon. On 18 March a popular uprising known as the Tumult of Aranjuez took place. A mob stormed Godoy's residence, where at first they only found his mistress Pepita. Two days later, Godoy was found; Charles had Godoy's property confiscated and then imprisoned him in the Castle of Villaviciosa de Odón, a property owned by his wife Maria Teresa. To end the uprising and to save Godoy's life, Charles IV abdicated in favour of his son Ferdinand VII.

Inspired by elements from outside its ranks, the royal guard had sought to impose its views upon the body politic by 'pronouncing' against the régime. Challenged by this call of arms, Godoy and his royal patrons found that they had few defenders. The officer corps as a whole was disgruntled by the failure of reforms to make any difference in its situation, and his orders to resist the French were already widely disobeyed; much of the upper nobility and the Church was hostile; reformist circles had long since lost all faith in Godoy's political credentials; and the common people were in a state of open revolt. As for Fernando, he was seen as a saviour, the reception that he received when he rode into Madrid on 24 March.

The new king was popular, but his security was not certain. Murat had occupied the city only the day before, and, despite increasingly abject attempts to win France's favour, refused to recognize Fernando. Carlos IV protested his abdication and appealed to Napoleon for assistance. With the two rivals openly craving his mediation, the emperor was placed in an ideal position to control events. He summoned Carlos, María Luisa, and Fernando to meet him for a conference at Bayonne (Godoy was rescued from captivity and transported to France). With all the contestants united in his presence, Napoleon demanded that the rival kings renounce the throne and hand it to the emperor. Carlos assented, and on 5 May Fernando's defiance was overcome and the throne was formally signed over to Napoleon in exchange for generous pensions for the royal family and guarantees of territorial and religious integrity for Spain.
With the whole of the Peninsula subjugated, Napoleon appeared to have achieved his every objective. However, even as the Bourbons departed into exile - Carlos, María Luisa and Godoy to Italy, and Fernando, his brother, Carlos, and uncle, Antonio, to Talleyrand's chateau at Valençay - the Peninsula remained restive.

Setting this aside, however, opportunism was the key. Napoleon had been motivated neither by an altruistic desire to spread the benefits of freedom and enlightenment, nor by a gigantic strategic combination, nor by an overwhelming clan loyalty that made the creation of family courts the centrepiece of French foreign policy. Strategic, ideological and historical factors were present in his thinking, certainly, but in the last resort what mattered was, first, the emperor's character, and, second, the force of circumstance. Forever eager to demonstrate his prowess, impose his stamp upon affairs, and demonstrate his contempt for diplomacy, the emperor was confronted with a situation in which nothing seemed to stand between him and the stroke that was more audacious than anything that he had yet attempted. Never had he been more wrong.

Exile 

Godoy spent the next few years living in exile with Charles, Maria Luisa, his daughter Carlota Luisa, his mistress Pepita, and their sons (Maria Teresa had divorced him in 1808). They lived for several months at Fontainebleau, then at Compiègne, and then at Aix-en-Provence. In October 1808, they arrived in Marseille, where they spent four years. In July 1812, they moved to Rome, where they lived in the Palazzo Barberini.

In April 1814, Ferdinand VII was restored as King of Spain (he had lived for six years in France). He refused to allow his parents or Godoy to return to Spain and had Pope Pius VII exile Godoy and his mistress to Pesaro.  During the Hundred Days, Charles IV and Maria Luisa fled from France to Verona, where they were joined by Godoy and Pepita. Godoy petitioned the Emperor Franz I of Austria for asylum in Vienna, but Ferdinand forbade it.

After Napoleon's final defeat, Charles IV, Maria Luisa and Pepita returned to Rome, but the Pope required Godoy to stay at Pesaro. In September 1815, Charles and Maria Luisa asked the pope to annul the marriage between Godoy and Maria Teresa. Godoy was allowed to return to Rome, but to preserve appearances, Pepita and her sons moved to Genoa. Ferdinand then bribed the police to expel Pepita and her family from Genoa; and again from Livorno. Finally, she found a home in Pisa.

In March 1818 Godoy's younger son Luis died. In October, Godoy became ill with malaria; he received the last rites, but recovered. At the end of the year, Maria Luisa caught pneumonia; Charles IV was absent in Naples at the time, but Godoy stayed by her bedside until she died, on 2 January 1819. Five days later, Charles IV wrote to Godoy asking him to vacate the Palazzo Barberini in Rome, only weeks before Charles himself died in Naples.

Ferdinand VII continued to forbid Godoy to return to Spain and ensured that he did not receive any state pension. He also did not allow Godoy's daughter Carlota to marry into a sovereign house, but did agree to her marriage in 1821 to Don Camillo Ruspoli, the younger son of a Roman princely family.

On 24 November 1828 Maria Teresa died at Paris. The following year or still in December of that year, Godoy married Pepita. The Pope made him 1st Principe di Paserano, but Godoy went to live in Paris in 1832, where they lived in somewhat straitened circumstances. Louis Philippe later gave him a pension.

In 1836 and 1839 Godoy published Memórias del Príncipe de la Paz, his memoirs. Charles IV had asked that he not do this until after the death of his son Ferdinand VII (who had died in 1833). Pepita returned to Spain in hopes of reclaiming the family properties. She died in Madrid on 20 September 1869.

In 1844 he was authorized to return to Spain. In 1847 the Spanish government returned to Godoy part of his confiscated property and restored his titles. He died in Paris in 1851. His body was buried first in the Church of Saint-Roch, but the following year was transferred to the Père Lachaise Cemetery, where it rests today.

The painting La maja desnuda by Francisco de Goya, which depicts a fully nude reclining woman, was once in Godoy's personal collection. It is variously claimed to portray Josefa, Countess of Castillo Fiel or Cayetana, Duchess of Alba, who were Godoy's mistresses.

Offices and titles 
Besides receiving many decorations, in Spain he carried many titles and offices:

Legacy 

Lord Byron mentions Godoy in his Childe Harold's Pilgrimage (Canto the First, XLVIII), where a Spanish lusty muleteer... chants "Viva el Rey" / And check his song to execrate Godoy, / The royal wittol Charles... etc. and in the note to these lines he explains that it is to this man that the Spaniards universally impute the ruin of their country.

See also 
 Prime Ministers of Spain

Notes

Further reading 
 Hilt, Douglas. "Manuel Godoy: Prince of Peace." History Today (Dec. 1971), Vol. 21 Issue 12, pp. 833-841, online.

External links
 

1767 births
1851 deaths
People from Badajoz
Counts of Spain
Dukes of Spain
101
Prime Ministers of Spain
Politicians from Extremadura
Grandees of Spain
Knights of the Golden Fleece of Spain
Male lovers of royalty
Spanish royal favourites
Spanish art collectors
Spanish generals
Spanish captain generals
Spanish people of Portuguese descent
Spanish prisoners and detainees
Burials at Père Lachaise Cemetery
Spanish people of the Napoleonic Wars
Spanish politicians convicted of crimes